Golden “The Big Machine” Mafwenta (born 15 January 2001) is a Zambian professional footballer who plays as a defender for the Zambia national football team.

References 
 

2001 births
Living people
Zambian footballers
Zambia international footballers
Zanaco F.C. players
Buildcon F.C. players
Association football defenders
Zambia A' international footballers
2020 African Nations Championship players
Expatriate soccer players in the United States
Zambian expatriate footballers
Zambian expatriate sportspeople in the United States
Real Monarchs players
MLS Next Pro players